Dehuj (also Romanized as Dehūj) is a village in Dashtab Rural District, in the Central District of Baft County, Kerman Province, Iran. At the 2006 census, its population was 165, in 44 families.

References 

Populated places in Baft County